Jesús Ricardo Iglesias (22 February 1922 in Pergamino – July 11, 2005 in Pergamino), was a racing driver from Argentina. He initially competed with some success in long distance races in Argentina with a Chevrolet Special, before being invited to drive one of the works Gordini Type 16s in the 1955 Argentine Grand Prix. He qualified 17th out of 22 competitors, but had to retire on lap 38 due to transmission failure, although he also seemed to be on the brink of exhaustion because of the boiling heat.

After that Iglesias went back to endurance racing, in which he competed solely in Argentinian races. He had his best result in the Rafaela 500-mile race in 1956, where he took second place in his Chevrolet Special car.

Complete Formula One World Championship results
(key)

References 

1922 births
2005 deaths
People from Pergamino
Argentine racing drivers
Argentine Formula One drivers
Gordini Formula One drivers
World Sportscar Championship drivers
Sportspeople from Buenos Aires Province
20th-century Argentine people